Four Men and a Prayer is a 1938 American adventure film directed by John Ford and starring Loretta Young, Richard Greene and George Sanders.

Plot
After Loring Leigh (C. Aubrey Smith), a  British Army Officer, is cashiered in India following accusations of dereliction of duty, he summons his four sons Geoffrey (Richard Greene), Wyatt (George Sanders), Christopher (David Niven), and Rodney (William Henry) to meet him in their family home. Leigh reveals he has been framed, but before he can explain any more he is murdered. With what little they know, the four boys immediately set out to discover the truth. The boys split up and travel to South America, India, and Egypt to gather evidence and restore their father's honour. During their travels, Geoffrey's girlfriend, Lynn (Loretta Young), continuously appears in the same locations as Geoffrey and his brother, Christopher.

First, Geoffrey and Christopher encounter Lynn in Buenos Aires where they witness a mass murder of townspeople that were in a war with the government, while Wyatt and Rodney are in India.

Later, Geoffrey and Christopher run into Lynn in Alexandria while they are reuniting with Wyatt and Rodney to confront Lynn's father, Martin Cherrington (Berton Churchill) who they believe is the person responsible for their father's death. Then they discover that Lynn had no idea of the situation and was not on her father's side about his contribution to being a major arms dealer, but it is also discovered that her father had no part in the death of the boys' father.

Once they discover the real person responsible for Leigh's murder, the four boys journey back home to present the evidence that their father was innocent.

Reception 
The response to Four Men and a Prayer was mixed. Mae Tinee from the Chicago Daily Tribune said "there's nothing like a good melodrama for grinding new grooves in the old thinking machine, and Four Men and a Prayer is a right pert groove grinder." However, Variety said the film "starts out as exciting melodrama, promising interesting romantic and adventurous...finishes as a piece of disappointing entertainment."

Cast
 Loretta Young as Miss Lynn Cherrington
 Richard Greene as Geoffrey Leigh
 George Sanders as Wyatt Leigh
 David Niven as Christopher Leigh
 C. Aubrey Smith as Col. Loring Leigh
 William Henry as Rodney Leigh
 J. Edward Bromberg as Gen. Torres
 John Carradine as Gen. Adolfo Arturo Sebastian
 Alan Hale as Mr. Furnoy
 Reginald Denny as Capt. Douglas Loveland
 Berton Churchill as Mr. Martin Cherrington
 Barry Fitzgerald as Trooper Mulcahay
 Claude King as Gen. Bryce
 Cecil Cunningham as Piper

References

Bibliography 
 Eyman, Scott. Print the Legend: The Life and Times of John Ford. Simon and Schuster, 2012.

External links
 
 
 
 

1938 films
1938 adventure films
American adventure films
American black-and-white films
Films directed by John Ford
Films based on American novels
Films with screenplays by Sonya Levien
Films with screenplays by William Faulkner
Films scored by Louis Silvers
Films set in London
Films set in India
Films set in England
Films set in Buenos Aires
Films set in Alexandria
Seafaring films
20th Century Fox films
1930s English-language films
1930s American films
English-language adventure films